Asa Smallidge Knowles (January 15, 1909 – August 11, 1990) was the ninth President of the University of Toledo and the third President of Northeastern University.  A graduate of Thayer Academy, Knowles went on to earn his AB from Bowdoin College in 1930 and his MA from Boston University a few years later. Knowles began his teaching career at Northeastern, leaving for several years to attend several administrative positions at the University of Rhode Island, the Associated Colleges of Upper New York (1946–1948), Cornell University (1948–1951), and the University of Toledo. During his time as president of Northeastern, lasting from 1959 to 1975, he expanded the physical campus and changed Northeastern's image from a "technical school" to a more professional university. Significantly, during his tenure, enrollment at Northeastern was increased from 15,000 undergraduates all the way up to 35,000, and up to 50 academic programs were added.

References

External links
The Asa S. Knowles papers, 1836–1990 (bulk 1920–1983) are located in the Northeastern University Libraries, Archives and Special Collections Department, Boston, MA.

1909 births
1990 deaths
American industrial engineers
University of Rhode Island faculty
Cornell University faculty
Bowdoin College alumni
Boston University alumni
People from Hancock County, Maine
Thayer Academy alumni
Presidents of the University of Toledo
Presidents of Northeastern University
20th-century American engineers
20th-century American academics